The 2019 Turkmenistan Cup is the 26th season of the Turkmenistan Cup knockout tournament. The cup winner qualifies for the 2020 AFC Cup.

The draw of the tournament was held on 6 July 2019. The competition started on 27 July 2019 and finished on 14 December 2019. The final match was played at the Nusaý Stadium in Ashgabat.

First round

First leg
The first leg match will be played on 27 July 2019.

Second leg
The second leg match will be played on 31 July 2019.

Quarter-finals

First legs
First legs were played on 13 and 15 August 2019.

Second legs
Second legs were played on 18 September 2019.

Semi-finals

First legs
First legs were played on 2 November 2019.

Second legs
Second legs were played on 3 and 4 December 2019.

Final
Final was played on 14 December 2019.

Top goalscorers

External links
 Official website
 Turkmenistan Cup 
 Football of Turkmenistan, VK.com
 Sport, Turkmenportal.com
 Photo report: FC Altyn Asyr won the 2019 Turkmenistan Football Cup

References

Turkmenistan Cup
Turkmenistan
Turkmenistan Cup